Myelois vestaliella is a species of snout moth in the genus Myelois. It was described by Nikolay Grigoryevich Erschoff in 1874. It is found in the Kyzylkum Desert in central Asia.

References

Moths described in 1874
Phycitini